The 2009 Seguros Bolívar Open Pereira was a professional tennis tournament played on outdoor red clay courts. It was part of the 2009 ATP Challenger Tour. It took place in Pereira, Colombia between April 27 and March 3, 2009.

Singles entrants

Seeds

 Rankings are as of April 20, 2009.

Other entrants
The following players received wildcards into the singles main draw:
  Andrés Herrera
  Felipe Mantilla
  Eduardo Struvay
  Mariano Zabaleta

The following players received entry from the qualifying draw:
  Juan Flores
  Sat Galan
  Sebastián López
  James Ward

Champions

Men's singles

 Alejandro Falla def.  Horacio Zeballos, 6–4, 4–6, 6–2.

Men's doubles

 Víctor Estrella /  João Souza def.  Juan Sebastián Cabal /  Alejandro Falla, 6–4, 6–4.

External links
Official website of Seguros Bolívar Tennis
ITF search 
2009 Draws

Seguros Bolivar Open Pereira
Tennis tournaments in Colombia
Seguros Bolívar Open Pereira
2009 in Colombian tennis